NGC 19 is a spiral galaxy in the Andromeda constellation. It was discovered by Lewis Swift on 20 September 1885. It is often incorrectly listed as a duplicate of NGC 21.

References

External links
 
 

Galaxies discovered in 1885
Barred spiral galaxies
NGC 0019
0019
00098
000759
18850920
Discoveries by Lewis Swift